Ficus fraseri, the white sandpaper fig or shiny sandpaper fig, is one of several fig species commonly known as sandpaper figs. It is native to New South Wales, Queensland and the Northern Territory in Australia and to New Caledonia and Vanuatu. Other common names are "figwood" and "watery fig".

It grows as either a shrub or tree with height ranging from around 6 to 15 metres.
Its leaves are 6 to 14 cm long and 2.5 to 6.5 cm wide on petioles that are 1 to 2 cm long. The rounded figs are 1 to 1.5 cm long and start out yellow in colour, maturing to orange-red between May and February in the species' native range. They are edible, but insipid.

In Australia, the species occurs from Tuggerah Lake in New South Wales, northwards to the Atherton Tableland in Queensland, and rarely in the Northern Territory.

The grey-headed flying fox feeds on the figs.

Although rarely seen in cultivation, it is a fast-growing, ornamental species. It can be easily propagated from seed.

Distribution
Chew states that F. fraseri is found in the Northern Territory, a statement repeated by Govaerts et al. However, Harden (1990) gives New South Wales and Queensland as the only Australian states where it is found. Botanists in Australia seem in little doubt about where it is found when the Australasian Virtual Herbarium data are consulted,  giving a distribution map. GBIF, unlike the Australian Plant Name Index and Plants of the World online, states that Ficus fraseri is a synonym of Ficus virens Aiton.  However, Australian botanists clearly distinguish the two species. (See the occurrence map for F. virens.)

Taxonomy
It was first described by Miquel in 1848.

References

fraseri
Rosales of Australia
Trees of Australia
Flora of New South Wales
Flora of Queensland
Flora of New Caledonia
Flora of Vanuatu
Flora of the Northern Territory
Trees of the Pacific
Taxa named by Friedrich Anton Wilhelm Miquel
Plants described in 1848